Harvest Partners is a private equity firm focused on leveraged buyout and growth capital investments in middle market industrial, business services, consumer and retail companies.

The firm, which was founded in 1981 by Harvey Mallement and Harvey Wertheim, is based in New York City.  Prior to co-founding Harvest, Mallement was managing partner of Masco Associates, making private equity investments on behalf of Masco Corporation and Wertheim managed venture capital and private equity investment activities at Research and Science Investors, a venture capital and investment management firm.

Since inception, Harvest has raised approximately $5 billion of investor capital across seven investment funds:

 1992 - $20m - Harvest Partners I
 1996 - $120m - Harvest Partners II
 1997 - $362m - Harvest Partners III
 2002 - $558m - Harvest Partners IV
 2006 - $815m - Harvest Partners V
 2011 - $1.1b - Harvest Partners VI
 2016 - $2.2b - Harvest Partners VII
 2020 - $4.1b - Harvest Partners VIII

In October 2018, Goldman Sachs Asset Management's Petershill program made a strategic minority investment in Harvest Partners representing 15 percent of the firm.

Source: Private Equity Intelligence

References

External links 
Harvest Partners (company website)

Private equity firms of the United States
Financial services companies established in 1981